Mauri Valtonen (born 1945) is a Finnish astronomer and professor at the University of Turku.  His fields of scientific interest include active galaxies, cosmology, and the three-body problem.

Valtonen completed a Ph.D. from Cambridge University in 1975. He served as Director of Tuorla Observatory from 1980 to 2002 and returned to this position again in 2007.

In 2008, Valtonen led a research team which argued that delay in the periodic outbursts from the nucleus of the active galaxy OJ 287 confirmed Albert Einstein's general theory of relativity.

References

Books by Mauri Valtonen

Valtonen, M. &  Karttunen, H. (2006). The Three-Body Problem. 251 pages. Cambridge University Press.
Byrd, G. G., Chernin A. D. & Valtonen M. (2007). Cosmology: Foundations and Frontiers. Moscow: URSS.

External links
 OJ 287 2005-2008 Project (Tuorla Observatory)
 A Supermassive Black Hole Pairing (Centauri Dreams)
 Mauri Valtonen's home page

21st-century astronomers
Finnish astronomers
Living people
1945 births